Actinoplanes abujensis is a bacterium from the genus Actinoplanes which has been isolated from arid soil in Abuja, Nigeria.

References

External links 
Type strain of Actinoplanes abujensis at BacDive -  the Bacterial Diversity Metadatabase

Micromonosporaceae
Bacteria described in 2012